Captain Gilbert Smith Doughty (1862 – 18 December 1909) CE was an architect based in Nottingham and Matlock.

History
Doughty was born in Nottinghamshire in 1862, the son of Edwin Doughty and Annie Smith. He was a pupil at University School, Nottingham and then studied at the Nottingham School of Art and in 1879 his design for a mantlepiece and glass was included in the annual exhibition.

On 12 April 1894 he married May Edgcombe Rendle in Winslow.

He served for a time in the Robin Hood Rifles, and in 1894 was appointed a captain. He resigned his commission on 13 May 1896.

In 1893 he took over the practice of George Edward Statham in Matlock.

He died in 1909 of alcoholism at his home in Prebend Mansions, Chiswick.

Works
New Lace Factory, Ilkeston Junction. 1886–87
St Paul's Church, Hyson Green Nottingham. 1889–91 Addition of the chancel.
Smedley's Hydro, Matlock 1892–94 new heating facility and baths (completed from plans by Statham)
The Borough Club, King Street, Nottingham. 1895 demolished 1961
Wirksworth Infant School 1895
Smart and Brown, furnishers. 5-9, Bridlesmith Gate, Nottingham 1895
Redmayne and Todd, Carrington Street, Nottingham 1896–97
Wirksworth Baptist Chapel 1897 renovation
Thurland Hall public house, Pelham Street, Nottingham. 1898–1900
No.s 70-82 Derby Road, Nottingham 1899
No.s 106-124 Derby Road, Nottingham 1898–99
Mills and Gibbs, 47 Stoney Street, Nottingham 1902 alterations
39 Stoney Street, Nottingham 1905 alterations
Mills Buildings, Plumptre Place, Lace Market, Nottingham 1906

References

1862 births
1909 deaths
19th-century English architects
20th-century English architects
Alumni of Nottingham School of Art
Architects from Nottingham
Sherwood Foresters officers
Military personnel from Nottinghamshire
Alcohol-related deaths in England